The Cornell–Colgate football rivalry is an American college football rivalry between the Cornell Big Red and the Colgate Raiders. The two teams have met 103 times since their first meeting in 1896. Cornell has played Colgate in football more times than any other opponent except Ivy League rivals Penn and Columbia. Cornell leads the series 51–49–3.

History
Cornell University, located in Tompkins County, New York, and Colgate University, located in Madison County, New York, are less than 100 miles from each other. Their close proximity and membership in rival athletic conferences (the Ivy League and the Patriot League, respectively) contribute to the rivalry between the two schools.

The Cornell and Colgate football teams met for the first time in Ithaca on September 26, 1896, a game that ended in a 6–0 victory for Cornell. Cornell would go on to win or tie the next 13 meetings until Colgate clinched its first win in the series, 13–7, in 1912. Cornell continued to dominate the series, compiling a 29–7–2 record against Colgate through 1951. Colgate took 9 of 13 meetings from 1952 through 1964, after which Cornell returned to dominance, winning 8 of 10 from 1965 through 1974. Since then, Colgate has held the advantage in the series, but Cornell's early dominance has rendered the all-time series record nearly even.

The game is usually played in late September or early October and has alternated between Cornell's Schoellkopf Field in Ithaca, New York, and Colgate's Andy Kerr Stadium in Hamilton, New York, since 2009. The rivalry has been largely uninterrupted from its beginning in 1896, but the teams did not meet in 1909–10, 1915–16, 1918, and 1924–36. The Cornell–Colgate game has been annual since 1937, save for four exceptions in 1994, 1995, 1998, and 2012. Of the teams' more notable meetings, Colgate was Cornell's opponent when Cornell played its first-ever Friday night home game in 2015, which Colgate won 28–21. In 2016, the Big Red defeated the nationally-ranked Raiders in Hamilton, 39–38, after having trailed 28–5; it was the first time Cornell defeated a ranked team on the road since 1950.

Game results

See also  
 List of NCAA college football rivalry games

References

College football rivalries in the United States
Colgate Raiders football
Cornell Big Red football
1896 establishments in New York (state)